The dust cap   (also known as dust dome, or dome) is a gently curved dome mounted either in concave or convex orientation over the central hole of most loudspeaker diaphragms. It protects the inner mechanics (such as the pole pieces and the voice coil) from small particles (which can cause rubs) and other contamination. Dust caps can also contribute structural integrity to the voice coil assembly or the cone.

In some loudspeaker designs dust caps can also be part of the acoustic design of the driver by radiating high frequency energy or suppressing it. Typically the dust cap is made of the same material as the cone. In some tweeter designs, the dome is in fact the only sound radiating surface and so it performs both roles.

References

 ALMA NP-002 Dust Cap Styles & Nomenclature
 ALMA DG-002 Dimensioning & Tolerancing Guidelines for Dust Caps
 ALMA MG-002 Measurement Guidelines for Dust Caps
 ALMA TM-213 Test Method for Measurement of Dust Cap Mass
 Sound Engineering from Loctite

Loudspeakers